Kévin N'Doram (born 22 January 1996) is a French professional footballer who plays as a defensive midfielder or defender for  club Metz. He is the son of the Chadian former footballer Japhet N'Doram.

Club career
N'Doram is a youth exponent from Monaco. He made his league debut on 20 August 2016 in a 1–0 away win over Nantes. He played the full game. N'Doram scored his first goal on 2 February 2017 in a Coupe de France round of 32 match against Chambly.

In November 2019, N'Doram was uninjured in a car crash which also involved team-mate Manuel Cabit, who was seriously hurt.

On 4 June 2020, N’Doram completed a permanent transfer to Metz for a fee of €4 million. He signed a four-year contract.

Career statistics

Honours
Monaco
Ligue 1: 2016–17
Coupe de la Ligue runner-up: 2017–18

References

External links
 
 

1996 births
Living people
Association football defenders
French footballers
France under-21 international footballers
French sportspeople of Chadian descent
French expatriate sportspeople in Monaco
Expatriate footballers in Monaco
Ligue 1 players
Ligue 2 players
AS Monaco FC players
FC Metz players
Black French sportspeople